IPL Information Processing Limited, commonly known as IPL, is a privately owned European software services company headquartered in Bath, UK, providing business consultancy, technical consultancy, IT solutions and support services. The firm was founded in 1979 and employs 278 staff. For the year ended 30 September 2014, the company posted a turnover of £27.3m.

History
IPL was founded in 1979 as a software development company by Michael Johnson, David Embleton and Clive Jones. Over time, it has expanded into the consultancy and managed services markets.

It moved to its current headquarters on Grove Street in 1986, which it extended in 1992. The company underwent a management buyout in 2008, which saw Shaun Davey become CEO.

In March 2012, IPL sold its Testing Products division, which had developed and distributed the Cantata++ and AdaTEST software testing tools, to QA Systems.

In October 2012, Neil Ellett replaced Shaun Davey as CEO. Ellett was replaced in June 2013 by Paul Jobbins.

In April 2016, IPL was acquired by Civica and as of the January 2017, has been rebranded as Civica Digital.

Operations
The company operates three main departments: Consultancy (branded 'Look'), Delivery (branded 'Build') and Service (branded 'Improve'). It also has an Innovations & Solutions Unit, which looks after research and development and the company's propositions and intellectual property.

The company operates in the following sectors:
 Transport
 Financial services
 Oil & Gas
 Pharmaceuticals & Life sciences
 Central government
 Local government
 Emergency services
 Defence

Notable clients include FirstGroup, Rail Settlement Plan, Highways England, the Environment Agency, Kent Police, the Home Office and Nationwide Building Society.

Certifications
IPL's Quality Management System has been certified to ISO 9001 since 1986, and the TickIT scheme since 1992. The company upgraded its TickIT certification to the new TickITplus standard in 2012. IPL holds ISO/IEC 27001:2013 (Information Security) and ISO 14001 (Environmental) certifications. The company is also a recognised Investor in People.

Community involvement
IPL was the main sponsor of Bath Rugby during the 2009–10 and 2010–11 seasons. It is now the club's Official Business Partner, and the South Stand at the Recreation Ground is named the IPL Stand. The company has also provided support for the Bath Rugby Foundation.

IPL also sponsored the  University of Bath's TeamBath rugby team from 2011 to 2013, and the netball team from 2011 to 2013.

The company sponsored the 2013 Bath Digital Festival, and also sponsors an undergraduate academic award at the University of Bristol.

References

External links

IT Network Support

Software companies of the United Kingdom
Management consulting firms of the United Kingdom
Technology companies of the United Kingdom
Information technology consulting firms of the United Kingdom
Mass media technology
Defence companies of the United Kingdom
Government software
Companies based in Bath, Somerset
Transport software